Marco Rudolf van Duin (born 11 February 1987) is a Dutch former professional footballer who played as a goalkeeper. He had formerly played for Haarlem, FC Volendam, Sparta Rotterdam and Almere City, NEC and FC Groningen.

Club career 
Van Duin progressed through the Ajax youth academy, before being promoted to the first team from Jong Ajax in 2007. In the summer of 2008, he joined HFC Haarlem, where he played his first professional game on 17 October 2008 against Excelsior.

After Haarlem's bankruptcy Van Duin moved to FC Volendam on a free transfer on 5 February 2010. In the following summer Van Duin signed a contract with NEC as third goalkeeper. After two seasons he joined Sparta Rotterdam as a free agent. In July 2013 he signed a one-year contract with Almere City. After two seasons at Almere he rejoined his former side NEC.

Van Duin announced his retirement from football after leaving FC Groningen in the spring of 2020. He continues a goalkeeper coach at former club, NEC.

References

External links
 Voetbal International profile 

1987 births
Living people
People from Harenkarspel
Dutch footballers
Association football goalkeepers
AFC Ajax players
FC Volendam players
HFC Haarlem players
NEC Nijmegen players
Sparta Rotterdam players
Almere City FC players
FC Groningen players
Eredivisie players
Eerste Divisie players
Footballers from North Holland